These are the official results of the Women's 10 km walk event at the 1998 European Championships in Budapest, Hungary. The event was held on August 20, 1998.

Medalists

Abbreviations
All times shown are in hours:minutes:seconds

Records

Final ranking

See also
 1995 Women's World Championships 10 km walk (Gothenburg)
 1996 Women's Olympic 10 km walk (Atlanta)
 1997 Women's World Championships 10 km walk (Athens)
 1998 Race Walking Year Ranking
 1999 Women's World Championships 10 km walk (Seville)
 2000 Women's Olympic 20 km walk (Sydney)
 2001 Women's World Championships 20 km walk (Edmonton)

References
 Results

Walk 10 km
Racewalking at the European Athletics Championships
1998 in women's athletics